TJ Mladosť Kalša is a Slovak football team, based in the village of Kalša.

Current squad
Updated 11 July 2020

Colours
Club colours are yellow and black.

Notable players
Had international caps for their respective countries. Players whose name is listed in bold represented their countries while playing for Mladosť Kalša.
Past (and present) players who are the subjects of Wikipedia articles can be found here.

 Ján Novák
 Jaroslav Kolbas

External links
profile at Kalša 
Ligy.sk profile 
  
Club profile at Futbalnet.sk 
Club profile at Soccerway

References

Football clubs in Slovakia